The Fliegerstaffel 9  of the  Swiss Air Force was in its  end equipped with de Havilland Venom Combat Aircraft. Their home base at the dissolution was the Sion Airport. The Fliegerstaffel 9 carried as coat of arms the side view of a red witch riding on a red broom. On a rectangular dark blue background. The witch and the broom were drawn without curves (apart from the black / white eye of the witch). Beneath the witch stands a flight of fliers with white writing. In the upper right corner is a white square 9.

History
The  Fliegerkompanie 9  was founded in 1925 and equipped with Fokker CV until 1936. These were replaced by the Dewoitine D-27, which were in service with this unit until 1940. 1940 followed the Messerschmitt Bf 109 and Morane D-3801. In 1945, the flying staff was assigned to the 9th Airborne Squadron. The propeller planes were delivered at the Fliegerstaffel 9 from 1947 onwards. From 1950, the squadron was equipped with the jet aircraft De Havilland D.H. 100 Vampires. De Havilland D.H. 100 Vampires was replaced  in 1967 by De Havilland D.H. 112 Venoms. The Fliegerstaffel  9 flew the DH-112 Venom until its deactivation in November 1982. Their task consisted from the 70-years in the ground combat training of young pilots, before they passed to the Hunter frontstaffel.
Formally, the Fliegerstaffel 9 was disestablished in 1994.

Airplanes 
 Fokker CV 
 Dewoitine D.27
 Morane D-3801
 Messerschmitt Bf 109
 de Havilland Vampire 
 de Havilland Venom

References

 Hermann Keist FlSt9
 Christophe Donnet: Hunter fascination. Schück, Adliswil 1995, 
Farbgebung und Kennzeichen der Schweizer Militäraviatik 1914-1950 (Georg Hoch)  
Flieger-Flab-Museum

Squadrons of the Swiss Air Force
Military units and formations established in 1925
Military units and formations disestablished in 1994
1994 disestablishments in Switzerland